The Battle of La Roche-Derrien was one of the battles of the Breton War of Succession; it was fought on 20 June 1347 during the night between Anglo-Breton and Franco-Breton forces. Approximately 4,000–5,000 French, Breton and Genoese mercenaries (the largest field army ever assembled by Charles of Blois) laid siege to the town of La Roche-Derrien in the hope of luring Sir Thomas Dagworth, the commander of the only standing English field army in Brittany at the time, into an open pitched battle.

Prelude
Charles of Blois, in an effort to defeat the English longbowmen, gave orders to set up four encampments around the town's four gates. Weak palisades were established to give cover for his men;his thinking being that the archers could not kill what they could not see. Charles gave his men strict orders to stay in their encampments so as not to be easy targets for the archers.

The battle
When Dagworth's relief army, less than one-fourth the size of the Franco-Breton force, arrived at La Roche-Derrien. They attacked the eastern (main) encampment and fell into the trap laid by Charles. Dagworth's main force was assailed with crossbow bolts from front and rear and after a short time Dagworth himself was forced to surrender.

Charles, thinking he had won the battle and that Brittany was effectively his, lowered his guard. However a sortie from the town, composed mainly of townsfolk armed with axes and farming implements, came from behind Charles's lines. The archers and men-at-arms who remained from the initial assault now rallied with the town's garrison to cut down Charles' forces. Charles was forced to surrender and was taken for ransom.

His strict orders to his commanders to stay in their encampments was his eventual downfall as the Anglo-Breton forces managed to clear each encampment one by one.

The Battle of La Roche-Derrien in historical fiction
The battle features in Bernard Cornwell's historical novel Vagabond—part of his Grail Quest series of books, set against the background of the Hundred Years' War.

The battle also features in Richard Donner’s 2003 film "Timeline", itself an adaptation of Michael Chrichton’s 1999 novel of the same name. The film follows a team of archaeologists-turned-time-travelers, lost during the battle.

References

The Postgrad Chronicles, Death, Treachery, & A Victory Against the Odds: Sir Thomas Dagworth & The Battle of La Roche Derrien

La Roche-Derrien
1347 in England
1347 in France
Conflicts in 1347
Military history of Brittany
War of the Breton Succession
History of Côtes-d'Armor